Conospermum croniniae is a shrub endemic to Western Australia.

It blooms between May and November producing blue flowers.

It is found on hill slopes and winter-wet flat areas in the Wheatbelt and Great Southern regions of Western Australia where it grows in sandy, loamy and often gravelly soils.

References

External links

Eudicots of Western Australia
croniniae
Endemic flora of Western Australia
Plants described in 1904